1974 had new titles such as Speed Race, Dungeon, Gran Trak 10, Tank and TV Basketball. The year's best-selling arcade game was Tank by Kee Games.

Best-selling arcade video games in the United States
The following titles were the best-selling arcade video games of 1974 in the United States, according to annual arcade cabinet sales estimates provided by Ralph H. Baer.

Events
 Namco acquires the Japanese division of Atari, Inc. and formally enters the video arcade game market.
 Atari acquires Kee Games. Atari will continue to use the "Kee Games" title as a brand name until 1978.

Notable releases

Magazines 
 Play Meter, the first magazine devoted to coin-operated amusements (including arcade games), publishes its first issue.

Arcade games 
 February – Taito releases Basketball, an early example of sprite graphics, used to represent baskets and player characters, making it the first video game with human figures. The same month, Midway licenses the game for a North American release under the title TV Basketball, making it the first Japanese game licensed for North American release.
 July 24 – Atari releases Gran Trak 10, the first car-racing video game, to video arcades.
 November – Taito releases Tomohiro Nishikado's Speed Race, the second car-racing video game. It introduces scrolling sprite graphics with collision detection, and uses a racing wheel controller. Midway releases it as Wheels and Racer in the United States.
 November 5 –  Prior to their acquisition by Atari, Kee Games releases Tank to video arcades.
Date Unknown - Nintendo releases Wild Gunman and Shooting Trainer in Japan. Outside of trade show demonstrations, the two games remain exclusive to the region until Sega releases them internationally in April 1976.

Computer games 

 Steve Colley, Howard Palmer, and Greg Johnson develop Maze War on the Imlac PDS-1 at the NASA Ames Research Center in California. It is recognized as an ancestor of the first-person shooter genre.
 Jim Bowery develops Spasim for the PLATO system. Two versions are released, the first in March and the second in July. It is also recognized as an ancestor of the first-person shooter genre.
 Gary Whisenhunt and Ray Wood develop dnd, the first game with a boss, and arguably the first role-playing video game, for the PLATO system. Development continued into 1975; it is unclear at what point the game became playable.

Video game consoles 
 Magnavox reissues the Odyssey and releases it in Australia, Belgium, the United Kingdom, France, West Germany, Greece, Israel, Italy, Switzerland, and Venezuela.

See also
1974 in games

References

Video games
Video games by year